As the Old Sang (or Sing), So the Young Pipe may refer to the paintings: 
 As the Old Sang, So the Young Pipe (Jordaens, Antwerp)
 As the Old Sang, So the Young Pipe (Jordaens, Valenciennes)
 As the Old Sing, So Pipe the Young (Jan Steen)